The St. Charles Hotel was a hotel on St. Charles Avenue in New Orleans, Louisiana, situated across the street from the St. Charles Museum. One of the first of the great hotels of the United States, the original Grecian palace-style building, opened in 1837, has been described by author Richard Campanella as "one of the most splendid structures in the nation and a landmark of the New Orleans skyline". It was some time before it found a rival in the Astor House, of New York City. It was said that the hotel's Parlor P had probably witnessed more important political events than any room or any building in the country, outside of the Capitol at Washington, D.C. During the Civil War, Union General Benjamin Butler seized the hotel to use for his headquarters after the city surrendered.  The third incarnation of the hotel was finally demolished in 1974.

First building

The original St. Charles Hotel was one of the first large buildings erected above Canal street. It had an immense dome and Corinthian portico. It had a Grecian front, capped by a tall, white cupola, second only in size to the dome of the Capitol at Washington.

The old St. Charles or Exchange Hotel, as it was generally called, was commenced in the summer of 1835, costing US$600,000 to build, in addition to the $100,000 paid for the ground. The St. Charles street car consisted of a projecting portico of six Corinthian columns, from which a flight of marble steps led to the hotel. From the street, a flight of marble steps led to the lower saloon, at the summit of which was a handsome marble statue of Washington. From the saloon a grand spiral staircase continues up to the dome, with a gallery stretching around it on each of the upper stories. Above the dome was an elegant Corinthian turret.

The hotel opened in 1837 and was destroyed by fire on January 18, 1851.

Second building

A larger hotel was rebuilt at a cost of $800,000. Barker retained very little interest in the hotel, and took no part in the rebuilding.
The second hotel opened in January 1853, during a time of political strife between 1851 and 1861, but became a highly successful venture. Col. R. E. Rivers, who was proprietor of the house, directed it, either alone or with a partner, from 1869. The office force consisted of Messrs. Kelsev, Mitchell, Davis and Wallace. In 1878, the St. Charles Hotel Company, who owned it, made $100,000 worth of improvements to the building, which thoroughly modernized it and gave it additional rooms. In 1888, the house had 400 rooms, accommodation for between 600 and 700 guests. There were 30 parlors and 100 bathrooms. It peaked in popularity during the Mardi Gras, when the building often become overcrowded.  The gold service of the hotel, estimated to be worth $16,000, was only used on extraordinary occasions. The second hotel burned down too, on April 28, 1894.

Third building

The third St. Charles Hotel opened on February 1, 1896. One author mentions that this building had "strings of colored lights" along its "mezzanine balcony", and contained trees in the hotel lobby. Sheraton Hotels bought the St. Charles in 1959 for $5 million and renamed it the Sheraton-Charles Hotel. The hotel was sold to local developer Louis J. Roussel Jr. in 1965, though Sheraton continued to operate it. On August 5, 1973, Rousell announced he would redevelop the site of the Sheraton-Charles. It closed and was demolished in 1974. The planned replacements, a 56-story office tower and a 40-story, 800-room hotel to be named the Grand St. Charles Hotel, were never built. Instead the lot sat vacant for nearly a decade, until the Place St. Charles tower was erected in 1984.

References

Bibliography

External links

Hotels in New Orleans
Defunct hotels in Louisiana
1837 establishments in Louisiana
Hotels established in 1837
Hotel buildings completed in 1837
Hotel buildings completed in 1853
Hotel buildings completed in 1896
Buildings and structures demolished in 1974
Demolished buildings and structures in Louisiana
Demolished hotels in the United States